The 2011 National Superstock 600 Championship season was the fourth season of the British National Superstock 600 Championship. The motorcycles are stock 600cc bikes, this means that not many racing modifications can be made to the bikes, to promote a close and affordable racing environment. The class is strictly for riders aged 16–25, with riders that finish the previous year in the top three of the championship are not eligible for the following season.

The previous year championship winner Josh Day moved up to the British Superbike Evo class, one of the main names to come into this class this year was James Lodge the former 2 time 125cc championship will be looking to move up and have a good season in this class. 
It began on 25 April at Brands Hatch and will end on 9 October at the same venue after 12 rounds.

Calendar

Notes:
1. – The race at Oulton Park was cancelled due to bad weather conditions. As a result, the race was run at Donington Park, with the grid positions standing for the race.

Championship standings

Notes
† Benjamin Gautrey was fatally injured in an accident during the Cadwell Park round.

References

2011 in Supersport racing
Motorsport competitions in the United Kingdom
2011 in British motorsport